Route 137 is a north/south highway on the south shore of the Saint Lawrence River in Quebec, Canada. Its northern terminus is in Saint-Denis-sur-Richelieu, at the junction of Route 133, and the southern terminus is in Granby at the junction of Route 112.

Municipalities along Route 137

 Granby
 Sainte-Cécile-de-Milton
 Saint-Dominique
 Saint-Hyacinthe
 La Presentation
 Saint-Denis-sur-Richelieu

Major intersections

See also
 List of Quebec provincial highways

References

External links 
 Provincial Route Map (Courtesy of the Quebec Ministry of Transportation) 
 Route 137 on Google Maps

137
Transport in Granby, Quebec
Transport in Saint-Hyacinthe